Albert of Monaco may refer to:

Albert I, Prince of Monaco (1848–1922), who reigned as Prince of Monaco from September 10, 1889, to June 26, 1922
Albert II, Prince of Monaco (born 1958), son of Prince Rainier III, and the current reigning Prince of Monaco since April 6, 2005